Antonio Caetani, iuniore (1566–1624) was a Roman Catholic cardinal.

Biography
On 11 Sep 1605, he was consecrated bishop by Roberto Francesco Romolo Bellarmino, Cardinal-Priest of San Matteo in Merulana.

Episcopal succession
While bishop, he was the principal consecrator of:

and the principal co-consecrator of:
Ottavio Acquaviva d'Aragona (seniore), Archbishop of Naples (1605); and
Mario Cossa, Bishop of Montalcino (1607).

References

1566 births
1624 deaths
17th-century Italian cardinals
Apostolic Nuncios to the Holy Roman Empire
Apostolic Nuncios to Spain
17th-century Italian Roman Catholic archbishops
Clergy from Rome